This is a list of members of the House of Lords, the upper house of the Parliament of the United Kingdom.

Current sitting members

Lords Spiritual

26 bishops of the Church of England sit in the House of Lords: the Archbishops of Canterbury and of York, the Bishops of London, of Durham and of Winchester, and the next 21 most senior diocesan bishops (with the exception of the Bishop in Europe and the Bishop of Sodor and Man). Under the Lords Spiritual (Women) Act 2015, female bishops take precedence over men until May 2025 to become new Lords Spiritual for the 21 seats allocated by seniority.

Lords Temporal
Lords Temporal include life peers, excepted hereditary peers elected under the House of Lords Act 1999 and remaining law life peers.

Note

Current non-sitting members 
There are also peers who remain members of the House, but are currently ineligible to sit and vote.

Peers on leave of absence 
Under section 23 of the Standing Orders of the House of Lords, peers may obtain a leave of absence for the remainder of a Parliament. The following peers are currently on a leave of absence.

Peers disqualified 
Under section 137(3) of the Constitutional Reform Act 2005, holders of certain judicial offices who are peers are disqualified from sitting and voting in the House of Lords while in office. The following peers are currently subject to this provision.

Peers suspended
The following peers are currently suspended from the House under section 12 of the Standing Orders, in implementation of section 1 of the House of Lords (Expulsion and Suspension) Act 2015.

Ceased to be members
Apart from retired Lords Spiritual and the surviving hereditary peers excluded under the House of Lords Act 1999, including the Marquess of Cholmondeley who was exempt from the 1999 Act by virtue of his position as Lord Great Chamberlain until the accession of Charles III in September 2022, there are a number of living peers who have permanently ceased to be members of the House.

Resigned
Under section 1 of the House of Lords Reform Act 2014, peers may permanently retire or otherwise resign their membership of the House. The following peers have exercised that right and are still living:

Removed for non-attendance
Under section 2 of the House of Lords Reform Act 2014, peers who fail to attend any sittings of the House during a whole parliamentary session cease to be members of the House at the start of the next session. The following peers have been subject to this provision since the Act came into force and are still living:

Resigned under the Constitutional Reform and Governance Act 2010
Under section 41 of the Constitutional Reform and Governance Act 2010, peers are automatically and compulsorily treated as domiciled in the United Kingdom for tax purposes. Section 42 allowed peers who did not wish to comply with the provision to choose within three months of the act coming into force to give notice with the same effect as to resign and retire from the House of Lords. The following peers opted to exercise that right and are still living:

Recently deceased
The following life peers and elected hereditary peers have died since March 2022:

Note

See also
List of life peerages
List of hereditary peers elected under the House of Lords Act 1999
List of hereditary peers in the House of Lords by virtue of a life peerage

References

External links
United Kingdom Parliament Alphabetical List of Members of the House of Lords

Lists of British people